Blood on the Black Robe is the sixth studio album by the Irish Celtic metal band Cruachan. It was released in 2011 on Candlelight Records.

Track listing

Personnel
Keith Fay – vocals, guitars, keyboards, bouzouki, mandolin, bodhrán, percussion
John Clohessy – bass guitar
Colin Purcell – drums, percussion
John Ryan – violin, mandocello, bouzouki
John Fay – tin whistle, low whistle, percussion, cover art

 Additional personnel
Alex Shkuroparsky – Galician bagpipe
Karen Gilligan – vocals on "An Bean Sidhe" and "The Voyage of Bran"
Peter Rees – artwork
Michael Richards – producer, recording

References

Cruachan (band) albums
2011 albums
Candlelight Records albums